"Imaginationland Episode III" is the twelfth episode in the eleventh season of Comedy Central's animated television series South Park. It originally aired on October 31, 2007. The episode was rated TV-MA LV in the United States. It is the third and final episode in a three-part story arc that won the 2008 Emmy for Outstanding Animated Program for One Hour or More. The three episodes were later reissued together, along with previously unreleased footage, as the uncensored Imaginationland: The Movie.

In the episode, Stan and Butters engage in the battle of their lives as they fight the army of evil imaginary forces. Meanwhile, Cartman remains determined to get Kyle, and do good for his bet.

Plot
In the conclusion from the previous two episodes, in which terrorists attacked the embodiment of human imagination, Imaginationland, and destroyed the barrier within that realm separating evil fictional characters from the good innocent ones, the armies of evil characters march towards Castle Sunshine, where the last surviving good characters have taken refuge. There, Butters Stotch has been informed that he is the key to repelling the evil hordes because, as a real person, he has the power to conjure up good characters from his imagination to fight the evil army approaching Castle Sunshine.

Meanwhile, in the real world, Al Gore, who has previously attempted to warn the public of the danger of ManBearPig, shows his staff the video made of that creature's appearance at The Pentagon in the previous episode, and embarks on an investigation of those events on behalf of the American people.

Kyle Broflovski awakens from his coma to see that Eric Cartman is making preparations in anticipation of Kyle sucking his testicles, completely ignoring the Imaginationland crisis and setting up a photo-shoot. Kyle finds that he has a telepathic link to Stan in Imaginationland, who alerts him to the events transpiring in that realm, where the good characters, outnumbered and largely untrained for combat, charge the evil army.

After Al Gore leaks the ManBearPig video to the public, The Pentagon informs the public of the recent events in Imaginationland and their plans to attack that realm with a nuclear weapon, setting off a public and legal controversy over whether the federal government has the jurisdiction to do this. Legal pundits discuss the state court case stemming from Cartman and Kyle's bet, Cartman v. Broflovski which ruled that imaginary characters are indeed real, which would preclude the government from taking action against the public's imagination.

On the battlefield, the good characters seem doomed. Led by Jesus, the good characters charge, but they are suffering from many casualties. Aslan orders Butters he must imagine Santa which Butters imagines, yet this version is a monstrous cephalopod creature. Butters is terrified and it abruptly fades away. However, Butters manages to master his conjuring ability, and summons appropriate forces that join the battle, and turn the tide in good's favor by focusing and imaging on the good.

The Supreme Court overturns the "Cartman vs. Broflovski decision" that imaginary creatures are real – imaginary creatures are declared not really real, so the government can bomb Imaginationland. Kyle is no longer legally required to suck Cartman's testicles, and he is instructed by Stan to stall the launch.

Kyle and Cartman break into the Pentagon again and Kyle, who finally agrees with him and convinces the officials to not bomb Imaginationland by arguing that imaginary creatures are just as real as real people because of the impact they have on people's lives. Cartman responds by telling Kyle that since imaginary creatures are real after all, then he loses their bet, and still has to suck Cartman's testicles. Kyle finally snaps and berates Cartman for not caring about the danger Stan and Butters are in just because of a stupid bet and that he doesn't care who won, because Kyle would rather go to jail than humiliate himself by sucking Cartman's testicles. Shocked that the missile launch is being abruptly cancelled, Al Gore saying, "ManBearPig has to die", launches the bomb himself, causing the portal to destabilize and sucks everyone in the room, as well as the nuclear missile, into Imaginationland.

The good characters' victory is interrupted by the missile's explosion, destroying everything in Imaginationland and killing everyone in it (including the people from the real world), and leaving nothing but a vast white emptiness. Butters survives the explosion and restores the realm with his imagination, back to how it was before the initial terrorist attack. Realizing the power of the realm, Cartman creates duplicates of himself and Kyle, in which imaginary Kyle sucks imaginary Cartman's testicles (off-screen). Kyle angrily states the scene is imaginary, to which Cartman insists that, in one's imagination, imaginary creatures are "real", as Kyle himself said earlier, therefore Kyle's agreement with Cartman is finally fulfilled. The Mayor agrees that at least here in Imaginationland, it is real. Santa then states that it's time for the boys to go home.

Butters suddenly wakes up in the real world, in his bedroom. His parents come in, and he tells them about the dream he just had. They inform Butters that it wasn't a dream, as they read about it in a newspaper, but they proceed to ground him anyway for not coming back from Imaginationland in time to clean out the basement. Enraged by this, Butters tries to use his powers to get out of being grounded, but is told by his parents that his powers only work in Imaginationland, and not in the real world. Disappointed, Butters lies back in bed and ends the episode with a low, unhappy and uncensored mutter of "Aw, shit".

Cultural references
The battle for Imaginationland parodies the battle at Helms Deep from The Lord of the Rings: The Two Towers and the Imaginationland castle is based after Rivendell, additionally Gandalf appears as one of the imaginary characters. Al Gore when he shows a video of 'man-bear-pig' attacking the army base the dialog echoes directly the Operatives opening lines from Serenity.

Reception and release

IGN gave the episode a rating of 8.5/10 calling it "another ambitious effort, with lofty themes, goofy humor and plenty of sequences that just seem to pack jokes and references into every frame". Josh Modell of The A.V. Club gave the trilogy a B grade, criticizing the slow pace of the main plot and calling it "more like an excuse for a nostalgia trip than a good arc." However, he praised Cartman's endless pursuit of his bet with Kyle and the return of the Christmas critters, calling their appearance, "some of the funniest moments in South Park's recent history,"

The Imaginationland Trilogy won the Primetime Emmy Award for Outstanding Animated Program (for Programming One Hour or More).

"Imaginationland Episode III", along with the thirteen other episodes from South Park'''s eleventh season, were released on a three-disc DVD set in the United States on August 12, 2008. The set includes brief audio commentaries by Parker and Stone for each episode. The entire trilogy was released as a standalone film titled Imaginationland: The Movie''.

References

External links

 "Imaginationland Episode III" Full episode at South Park Studios
 

South Park (season 11) episodes
South Park episodes in multiple parts
Cultural depictions of Al Gore
Portrayals of Jesus on television
Witchcraft in television
Wizards in television